The swimming competition at the 1977 Summer Universiade took place in Sofia, Bulgaria.

Medal table

Men's events

Legend:

Women's events

Legend:

References
Medalist Summary (Men) on GBRATHLETICS.com
Medalist Summary (Women) on GBRATHLETICS.com

 

1977 Summer Universiade
1977 in swimming
Swimming at the Summer Universiade